Joãozinho is a nickname of João, meaning "little João", and may refer to:
Joãozinho (footballer, born 1954), born João Soares Almeida Filho, Brazilian football forward
Joãozinho Neto (born 1980), born João Soares de Almeida Neto, Brazilian football forward 
Joãozinho (footballer, born 1988), born João Natailton Ramos dos Santos, Brazilian football winger for Sochi
Joãozinho (footballer, born 1989), born João Carlos Reis Graça, Portuguese football left-back for Estoril
Joãozinho (footballer, born 1997), born João Pedro Martins Cunha Fernandes, Portuguese football midfielder for Vitoria